Wang Shaojun (born 1955) is a lieutenant general of the People's Liberation Army Ground Force. He serving as the director of the Central Security Bureau of the Communist Party of China since 2015. Wang was born in Yongnian County, Hebei province. He was promoted to the rank of major general in 2008, then in 2010 became the deputy director of the Central Security Bureau. In March 2015 he was promoted to director.

In Xi Jinping's visit to the Eastern Military Command in December 2014, Wang was shown accompanying Xi. It was likely that Wang was in charge of Xi's personal security before he took on the role of the director of the CSB. Wang was promoted to lieutenant general in July 2016.

References

1955 births
People's Liberation Army generals from Hebei
People from Handan
Living people